Vinoth Baskaran (born 16 May 1990) is a Singaporean cricketer.

In July 2019, he was named in Singapore's Twenty20 International (T20I) squad for the Regional Finals of the 2018–19 ICC T20 World Cup Asia Qualifier tournament.  He made his T20I debut against Qatar on 22 July 2019. In September 2019, he was named in Singapore's squad for the 2019 Malaysia Cricket World Cup Challenge League A tournament. He made his List A debut for Singapore, against Qatar, in the Cricket World Cup Challenge League A tournament on 17 September 2019.

In October 2019, he was named in Singapore's squad for the 2019 ICC T20 World Cup Qualifier tournament in the United Arab Emirates.

References

External links
 

1990 births
Living people
Singaporean cricketers
Singapore Twenty20 International cricketers
Singaporean people of Tamil descent
Singaporean sportspeople of Indian descent